is a financial services firm in Japan. It is a wholly owned subsidiary of Citigroup Japan Holdings Corp., the main Japanese holding company of American financial firm Citigroup.

Nikko Cordial and Citigroup first established a joint venture in Japan in 1999 as Salomon Smith Barney Japan Ltd., a company registered and domiciled in the Cayman Islands which operated through a "branch office" in Japan under the trade name .

The company was re-incorporated in Japan in December 2003 and renamed Nikko Citigroup as part of an overall unification of the Citigroup brand.

Nikko Citigroup is a member of the Tokyo Stock Exchange, Osaka Stock Exchange, Nagoya Stock Exchange and JASDAQ. Its headquarters are located in the Shin-Marunouchi Building in Otemachi, Chiyoda, Tokyo. It also has a branch office in the Sonezaki district of Kita-ku, Osaka.

In October 2007, Citigroup purchased Nikko Cordial Corporation.

At the 2008 ALB Japan Law Awards, Nikko Citigroup was crowned:
 In-House of the Year - International Investment Bank In-House Team of the Year
 Deal of the Year - M&A Deal of the Year
 Deal of the Year - Japan Deal of the Year

On October 1, 2009, Citigroup sold parts of Nikko Cordeal to Sumitomo Mitsui Financial Group and renamed the remaining company to Citigroup Global Markets Japan Inc. The domestic stock and bond underwriting business among others were spun off into Nikko Cordial Securities which was acquired by Sumitomo Mitsui Banking Corporation, a wholly owned subsidiary of Sumitomo Mitsui Financial Group, while the investment banking business remained with Citigroup Global Markets Japan.

References

External links 
 The Citigroup Global Markets Japan Story Company Milestones

Citigroup
Financial services companies based in Tokyo